is a railway station on the Kintetsu Nagoya Line, and is located in Nakamura-ku, Nagoya, Japan.

Layout
The station is elevated, and has 2 island platforms serving 4 tracks with 1 siding track in the direction of Kanie.

Staff at our station 
The number of passengers per day of the station is as follow

Connections
Hatta Station
JR Central Kansai Line
Nagoya Subway Higashiyama Line

Adjacent stations

Railway stations in Aichi Prefecture